Leyla Qasim (1952  – 12 May 1974) was a Feyli Kurdish activist against the Iraqi Ba'ath regime who was executed in Baghdad. She is known as a national martyr among the Kurds.

Birth and childhood
She was the third out of five children born to a Kurdish farmer, Dalaho Qasim, and his wife Kanî. She was born in Khanaqin but was relocated to Erbil when she was four years old.

Education 
Leyla and her brother Çiyako were taught Arabic and agriculture by their mother when they were aged six and eight. In 1958 she entered elementary and later finished secondary school in Khanaqin. In 1971 she moved to Baghdad to study sociology at the University of Baghdad.

Political activism
Leyla Qasim was sixteen years old as Abdul Rahman Arif was overthrown by Ba'ath party leader, General Ahmed Hassan al-Bakr in 1968. Leyla was disturbed by the violent takeover in the capital. During the late 1960s, Leyla and Çiyako wrote pamphlets on the horrors of the Ba'ath party including the new leader, Saddam Hussein, whom they described as being against Kurdish independence.

Leyla spoke to several Kurds in the Kurdistan Region about the Ba'ath regime and the loose morals of the members. Leyla was told that her words were inspiring sedition.

In 1970 she joined the Kurdistan Students Union and the Kurdistan Democratic Party.

On 28 April 1974 she was detained together with four others and accused of attempting to hijack a plane. She was arrested, tortured and, in Baghdad on 12 May 1974, ultimately hanged after a show trial, broadcast throughout Iraq. She was accused of having planned to kill Saddam Hussein. She was the first woman to be hanged by the Iraqi Ba'ath party. Executed along with Qasim were also Jawad Hamawandi, Nariman Fuad Masti, Hassan Hama Rashid and Azad Sleman Miran.

Remembrance 
Many Kurdish families named their children Leyla after her. Every year the anniversary of her death is remembered by many Kurds. In Kelar there exists a Leyla Qasim Park.

References

1952 births
1974 deaths
Iraqi Kurdish women
Kurdish women in politics
People from Khanaqin
Executed Iraqi people
Executed Kurdish people
Executed Iraqi women
People executed by Iraq by hanging
20th-century executions by Iraq
Executed activists
University of Baghdad alumni
20th-century Iraqi women politicians
20th-century Iraqi politicians